Mirpurina mediocincta is a species of sea snail, a marine gastropod mollusk in the family Marginellidae, the margin snails.

Description

Distribution
This marine species occurs off the Cape Verdes.

References

 Ortea J. & Moro L. (2020). Marginella (Volvarina) mediocincta E. A. Smith, 1875, (Mollusca: Marginellidae), una especie válida de Mirpurina Ortea, Moro & Espinosa, 2017, de las islas de Cabo Verde. Avicennia. 27: 23–2

External links
 Smith E.A. (1875). Descriptions of two new species of Marginellidae from the Cape-Verd Islands. Annals and Magazine of Natural History. ser. 4, 16: 200–201
 Jousseaume F. 1877. Description de quelques Mollusques nouveaux. Bulletin de la Société Zoolgique de France (1876), 1: 265–273, 5 pl

Marginellidae
Gastropods described in 1875